Rotation, or spin, is the circular movement of an object around a central axis. A two-dimensional rotating object has only one possible central axis and can rotate in either a clockwise or counterclockwise direction. A three-dimensional object has an infinite number of possible central axes and rotational directions.

If the rotation axis passes internally through the body's own center of mass, then the body is said to be autorotating or spinning, and the surface intersection of the axis can be called a pole. A rotation around a completely external axis, e.g. the planet Earth around the Sun, is called revolving or orbiting, typically when it is produced by gravity, and the ends of the rotation axis can be called the orbital poles.

Mathematics

Mathematically, a rotation is a rigid body movement which, unlike a translation, keeps a point fixed. This definition applies to rotations within both two and three dimensions (in a plane and in space, respectively.)

All rigid body movements are rotations, translations, or combinations of the two.

A rotation is simply a progressive radial orientation to a common point. That common point lies within the axis of that motion. The axis is 90 degrees perpendicular to the plane of the motion. 

If a rotation around a point or axis is followed by a second rotation around the same point/axis, a third rotation results. The reverse (inverse) of a rotation is also a rotation. Thus, the rotations around a point/axis form a group. However, a rotation around a point or axis and a rotation around a different point/axis may result in something other than a rotation, e.g. a translation.

Rotations around the x, y and z axes are called principal rotations. Rotation around any axis can be performed by taking a rotation around the x axis, followed by a rotation around the y axis, and followed by a rotation around the z axis. That is to say, any spatial rotation can be decomposed into a combination of principal rotations.

In flight dynamics, the principal rotations are known as yaw, pitch, and roll (known as Tait–Bryan angles). This terminology is also used in computer graphics.

Astronomy

In astronomy, rotation is a commonly observed phenomenon. Stars, planets and similar bodies all spin around on their axes. The rotation rate of planets in the solar system was first measured by tracking visual features. Stellar rotation is measured through Doppler shift or by tracking active surface features.

This rotation induces a centrifugal acceleration in the reference frame of the Earth which slightly counteracts the effect of gravitation the closer one is to the equator. Earth's gravity combines both mass effects such that an object weighs slightly less at the equator than at the poles. Another is that over time the Earth is slightly deformed into an oblate spheroid; a similar equatorial bulge develops for other planets.

Another consequence of the rotation of a planet is the phenomenon of precession. Like a gyroscope, the overall effect is a slight "wobble" in the movement of the axis of a planet. Currently the tilt of the Earth's axis to its orbital plane (obliquity of the ecliptic) is 23.44 degrees, but this angle changes slowly (over thousands of years). (See also Precession of the equinoxes and Pole star.)

Revolution

While revolution is often used as a synonym for rotation, in many fields, particularly astronomy and related fields, revolution, often referred to as orbital revolution for clarity, is used when one body moves around another while rotation is used to mean the movement around an axis. Moons revolve around their planet, planets revolve about their star (such as the Earth around the Sun); and stars slowly revolve about their galaxial center. The motion of the components of galaxies is complex, but it usually includes a rotation component.

Retrograde rotation

Most planets in the Solar System, including Earth, spin in the same direction as they orbit the Sun. The exceptions are Venus and Uranus. Venus may be thought of as rotating slowly backward (or being "upside down"). Uranus rotates nearly on its side relative to its orbit. Current speculation is that Uranus started off with a typical prograde orientation and was knocked on its side by a large impact early in its history. The dwarf planet Pluto (formerly considered a planet) is anomalous in several ways, including that it also rotates on its side.

Physics

The speed of rotation is given by the angular frequency (rad/s) or frequency (turns per time), or period (seconds, days, etc.). The time-rate of change of angular frequency is angular acceleration (rad/s²), caused by torque. The ratio of the two (how heavy is it to start, stop, or otherwise change rotation) is given by the moment of inertia.

The angular velocity vector (an axial vector) also describes the direction of the axis of rotation. Similarly the torque is an axial vector.

The physics of the rotation around a fixed axis is mathematically described with the axis–angle representation of rotations. According to the right-hand rule, the direction away from the observer is associated with clockwise rotation and the direction towards the observer with counterclockwise rotation, like a screw.

Cosmological principle
The laws of physics are currently believed to be invariant under any fixed rotation. (Although they do appear to change when viewed from a rotating viewpoint: see rotating frame of reference.)

In modern physical cosmology, the cosmological principle is the notion that the distribution of matter in the universe is homogeneous and isotropic when viewed on a large enough scale, since the forces are expected to act uniformly throughout the universe and have no preferred direction, and should, therefore, produce no observable irregularities in the large scale structuring over the course of evolution of the matter field that was initially laid down by the Big Bang.

In particular, for a system which behaves the same regardless of how it is oriented in space, its Lagrangian is rotationally invariant. According to Noether's theorem, if the action (the integral over time of its Lagrangian) of a physical system is invariant under rotation, then angular momentum is conserved.

Euler rotations

Euler rotations provide an alternative description of a rotation. It is a composition of three rotations defined as the movement obtained by changing one of the Euler angles while leaving the other two constant. Euler rotations are never expressed in terms of the external frame, or in terms of the co-moving rotated body frame, but in a mixture. They constitute a mixed axes of rotation system, where the first angle moves the line of nodes around the external axis z, the second rotates around the line of nodes and the third one is an intrinsic rotation around an axis fixed in the body that moves.

These rotations are called precession, nutation, and intrinsic rotation.

Flight dynamics

In flight dynamics, the principal rotations described with Euler angles above are known as pitch, roll and yaw. The term rotation is also used in aviation to refer to the upward pitch (nose moves up) of an aircraft, particularly when starting the climb after takeoff.

Principal rotations have the advantage of modelling a number of physical systems such as gimbals, and joysticks, so are easily visualised, and are a very compact way of storing a rotation. But they are difficult to use in calculations as even simple operations like combining rotations are expensive to do, and suffer from a form of gimbal lock where the angles cannot be uniquely calculated for certain rotations.

Amusement rides
Many amusement rides provide rotation. A Ferris wheel has a horizontal central axis, and parallel axes for each gondola, where the rotation is opposite, by gravity or mechanically. As a result, at any time the orientation of the gondola is upright (not rotated), just translated. The tip of the translation vector describes a circle. A carousel provides rotation about a vertical axis. Many rides provide a combination of rotations about several axes. In Chair-O-Planes the rotation about the vertical axis is provided mechanically, while the rotation about the horizontal axis is due to the centripetal force. In roller coaster inversions the rotation about the horizontal axis is one or more full cycles, where inertia keeps people in their seats.

Sports

Rotation of a ball or other object, usually called spin, plays a role in many sports, including topspin and backspin in tennis, English, follow and draw in billiards and pool, curve balls in baseball, spin bowling in cricket, flying disc sports, etc. Table tennis paddles are manufactured with different surface characteristics to allow the player to impart a greater or lesser amount of spin to the ball.

Rotation of a player one or more times around a vertical axis may be called spin in figure skating, twirling (of the baton or the performer) in baton twirling, or 360, 540, 720, etc. in snowboarding, etc. Rotation of a player or performer one or more times around a horizontal axis may be called a flip, roll, somersault, heli, etc. in gymnastics, waterskiing, or many other sports, or a one-and-a-half, two-and-a-half, gainer (starting facing away from the water), etc. in diving, etc. A combination of vertical and horizontal rotation (back flip with 360°) is called a möbius in waterskiing freestyle jumping.

Rotation of a player around a vertical axis, generally between 180 and 360 degrees, may be called a spin move and is used as a deceptive or avoidance maneuver, or in an attempt to play, pass, or receive a ball or puck, etc., or to afford a player a view of the goal or other players. It is often seen in hockey, basketball, football of various codes, tennis, etc.

Fixed axis vs. fixed point
The end result of any sequence of rotations of any object in 3D about a fixed point is always equivalent to a rotation about an axis. However, an object may physically rotate in 3D about a fixed point on more than one axis simultaneously, in which case there is no single fixed axis of rotation - just the fixed point. However, these two descriptions can be reconciled - such a physical motion can always be re-described in terms of a single axis of rotation, provided the orientation of that axis relative to the object is allowed to change moment by moment.

Axis of 2 dimensional rotations
2 dimensional rotations, unlike the 3 dimensional ones, possess no axis of rotation. This is equivalent, for linear transformations, with saying that there is no direction in the plane which is kept unchanged by a 2 dimensional rotation, except, of course, the identity.

The question of the existence of such a direction is the question of existence of an eigenvector for the matrix A representing the rotation. Every 2D rotation around the origin through an angle  in counterclockwise direction can be quite simply represented by the following matrix:

A standard eigenvalue determination leads to the characteristic equation
,
which has

as its eigenvalues. Therefore, there is no real eigenvalue whenever , meaning that no real vector in the plane is kept unchanged by A.

Rotation angle and axis in 3 dimensions
Knowing that the trace is an invariant, the rotation angle  for a proper orthogonal 3x3 rotation matrix  is found by

Using the principal arc-cosine, this formula gives a rotation angle satisfying . The corresponding rotation axis must be defined to point in a direction that limits the rotation angle to not exceed 180 degrees.

Every proper rotation  in 3D space has an axis of rotation, which is defined such that any vector  that is aligned with the rotation axis will not be affected by rotation. Accordingly, and the rotation axis therefore corresponds to an eigenvector of the rotation matrix associated with an eigenvalue of 1. As long as the rotation angle  is nonzero (i.e., the rotation is not the identity tensor), there is one and only one such direction. Because A has only real components, there is at least one real eigenvalue, and the remaining two eigenvalues must be complex conjugates of each other (see Eigenvalues and eigenvectors#Eigenvalues and the characteristic polynomial). Knowing that 1 is an eigenvalue, it follows that the remaining two eigenvalues are complex conjugates of each other, but this does not imply that they are complex—they could be real with double multiplicity. In the degenerate case of a rotation angle , the remaining two eigenvalues are both equal to -1. In the degenerate case of a zero rotation angle, the rotation matrix is the identity, and all three eigenvalues are 1 (which is the only case for which the rotation axis is arbitrary).

A spectral analysis is not required to find the rotation axis. If  denotes the unit eigenvector aligned with the rotation axis, and if  denotes the rotation angle, then it can be shown that . Consequently, the expense of an eigenvalue analysis can be avoided by simply normalizing this vector if it has a nonzero magnitude. On the other hand, if this vector has a zero magnitude, it means that . In other words, this vector will be zero if and only if the rotation angle is 0 or 180 degrees, and the rotation axis may be assigned in this case by normalizing any column of  that has a nonzero magnitude.

This discussion applies to a proper rotation, and hence . That is, any improper orthogonal 3x3 matrix may be decomposed as a proper rotation (from which an axis of rotation can be found as described above) followed by an inversion (multiplication by -1).

Rotation plane

As much as every tridimensional rotation has a rotation axis, also every tridimensional rotation has a plane, which is perpendicular to the rotation axis, and which is left invariant by the rotation. The rotation, restricted to this plane, is an ordinary 2D rotation.

The proof proceeds similarly to the above discussion. First, suppose that all eigenvalues of the 3D rotation matrix A are real. This means that there is an orthogonal basis, made by the corresponding eigenvectors (which are necessarily orthogonal), over which the effect of the rotation matrix is just stretching it. If we write A in this basis, it is diagonal; but a diagonal orthogonal matrix is made of just +1s and −1s in the diagonal entries. Therefore, we don't have a proper rotation, but either the identity or the result of a sequence of reflections.

It follows, then, that a proper rotation has some complex eigenvalue. Let v be the corresponding eigenvector.

Also, they are both real vectors by construction.

This plane is orthogonal to the invariant axis, which corresponds to the remaining eigenvector of A, with eigenvalue 1, because of the orthogonality of the eigenvectors of A.

See also 

 
 
 
 
 
 
 , the fastest rotation object

References

External links
 
 Product of Rotations at cut-the-knot. cut-the-knot.org
 When a Triangle is Equilateral at cut-the-knot. cut-the-knot.org
 Rotate Points Using Polar Coordinates, howtoproperly.com
 Rotation in Two Dimensions by Sergio Hannibal Mejia after work by Roger Germundsson and Understanding 3D Rotation by Roger Germundsson, Wolfram Demonstrations Project. demonstrations.wolfram.com
 Rotation, Reflection, and Frame Change: Orthogonal tensors in computational engineering mechanics, IOP Publishing

 
Euclidean geometry
Classical mechanics
Orientation (geometry)
Kinematics